Rhytiphora pulverulea is a species of beetle in the family Cerambycidae. It was described by Jean Baptiste Boisduval in 1835. It is known from Australia.

References

pulverulea
Beetles described in 1835